Adela is a 2008 Filipino drama independent film starring Anita Linda. The film was a tribute for the film veteran which won Best Actress awards from the Gawad Tanglaw, 10th Cinemanila International Film Festival (Southeast Asia Film Competition) and Young Critics Circle for her portrayal of the titular character.

The story of Adela, which takes place in the span of one day, is a heartbreaking story of a woman who longs for the company of her loved ones.

Synopsis
On her eightieth birthday, Adela prepares enough food to accommodate her children who all promised to be present during the occasion. She goes around the community and helps those who are in need. She tries to treat it like a normal day—doing her daily chores and duties but the widow can't hide her loneliness.

Adela has three children: an OFW who works in Qatar; a drug addict son (portrayed by Ricky Davao) who is currently in jail; and a daughter who works as a housemaid in Makati. They all fail to show up and greet her, prompting her to spend the day alone in Freedom Island, a bird sanctuary where mangroves are abundant.

Plot
On her way home, Mercy (Angeli Bayani), heavily pregnant discovered her live-in partner PJ (Jason Abalos), is sleeping with her mistress (Cyra de la Cerna). To her dismay, she accidentally labored with the help of Aling Adela (Anita Linda), a former midwife. Celebrating her 80th birthday, Adela expects her children to come along with her grand children. On the other hand, PJ with the baranggay captain invited Aling Adela for a gathering to celebrate the birth of his baby and at the same time convince her to join the prayer rally for President Arroyo but in excuse she wants to have her day with her children. As she prepares to go to church, Benjo (Joem Bascon) came to sell a toaster and a cellphone charger. She then discovered her wedding ring was gone then went to a junk shop manager and found out that the appliances she bought are all stolen from Aling Glenda (Perla Bautista). She confronted the young snatcher and pleaded for her ring back but he won’t simply admit it. She simply went to church to pray and give thanks for this special day but she then saw the young snatchers activities. She also met her former co-league in the radio. There were chit-chats and Adela refuses to discuss how lonely her life is. Near the church, she also bought toys and decorations for her apos. She went also to the local prison to visit her son only to find out that her son is about to be convicted and be transferred in the Muntinglupa. She then decided to attend the PJ’s celebration with all the drinking and karaoke singing. While all the gang is singing “Luha”, she got a call from her daughter. It is unclear but based on the reaction of Adela, her daughter won’t be able to come. She went home, gave some pancit to her neighbour. She also went to the young snatcher’s mother and gave the appliance back only to discover an illicit love affair with a stud.  As everyone went to the prayer rally, Adela silently went to the river shore and celebrated 80th birthday with an uncertain hope and much pain. The film ended with a disturbing scene where Adela went to a bush place and leaves the audience hanging what happened.

Cast
 Anita Linda as Adela Macaraig
 Joem Bascon as Benjo
 Jason Abalos as PJ
 Angeli Bayani as Mercy
 Perla Bautista as Glenda
 Ricky Davao as Felipe Macaraig
 German Moreno as Himself
 Kenneth Ocampo as Joy
 Arnold Reyes as Jericho
 Zyra dela Cerna as PJ's mistress
 Iza Calzado as Tina
 Joy Napoles as Jona
 Armando Reyes as Larry

Release
Adolfo Alix Jr.'s Adela was the opening film of the Cinemalaya Philippine Independent Film Festival held at the Cultural Center of the Philippines on July 20, 2008.

Adolfo Alix Jr. Adela was also shown in the World Cinema Section of the 2008 Toronto International Film Festival.

Accolades

|-
| rowspan="13"| 2009 
|International Film Festival Rotterdam 
| Film Presented 
| 
|-
|Vladivostok International Film Festival
|Official Selection
|
|-
|Melbourne International Film Festival
|Official Selection
|
|-
|Moscow International Film Festival
|Official Selection
|
|-
|Sarasota Film Festival
|Narrative Competition
|
|-
| San Francisco Asian-American Film Festival
|Official Selection International Showcase Competition
|
|-
|rowspan="7"|Young Critics Circle Awards
| Best Actress for Anita Linda  
| 
|-
|Best Picture
|
|-
|Best Performance
|
|-
|Best Screenplay
|
|-
|Best Cinematography and Visual Design
|
|-
|Best Editing
|
|-
|Best Sound and Aural Orchestration 
|
|-
| rowspan="4"|2008
| 2008 Toronto International Film Festival
| Official Selection Contemporary World Cinema
| 
|-
|Cinemanila International Film Festival
| Best Actress for Anita Linda  
|
|-
| Pusan International Film Festival
|Official Selection Window to Asian Cinema
|
|-
|Cinemalaya Independent Film Festival
|Opening Film
|
|}

References

External links
 
 

2008 films
2000s Tagalog-language films
Philippine drama films
2008 drama films
Films directed by Adolfo Alix Jr.